= Opinion polling on the United Kingdom's membership of the European Union =

This page lists public opinion polls that have been conducted in relation to the issue of the United Kingdom's membership of the European Union, the conclusion of which became known as Brexit. A referendum on the subject was held on 23 June 2016.

== 2016 referendum polling ==
The 2016 United Kingdom European Union membership referendum took place on 23 June 2016.

== Post-referendum period (2016–2020) ==
Polling covering the period from the referendum on 23 June 2016 until the UK completed its split from the bloc on 31 December 2020.

== Rejoining (since 2020) ==
Polling continued to be conducted on the UK rejoining the EU after its formal exit in early 2020.
